Mastanabad may refer to:
 Mastanabad, Ardabil
 Mastanabad, West Azerbaijan